Georg Werner Eriksson (19 January 1901, Jakobstad – 28 February 1964) was a Finnish goldsmith and politician. He was a member of the Parliament of Finland from 1958 until his death in 1964, representing the Social Democratic Party of Finland (SDP).

References

1901 births
1964 deaths
People from Jakobstad
People from Vaasa Province (Grand Duchy of Finland)
Swedish-speaking Finns
Social Democratic Party of Finland politicians
Members of the Parliament of Finland (1958–62)
Members of the Parliament of Finland (1962–66)